Nizhneantoshinsky is a rural locality (a khutor) in Verkhnebezymyanovskoye Rural Settlement, Uryupinsky District, Volgograd Oblast, Russia. The population was 140 as of 2010. There are 2 streets.

Geography 
Nizhneantoshinsky is located 36 km northwest of Uryupinsk (the district's administrative centre) by road. Grigoryevsky is the nearest rural locality.

References 

Rural localities in Uryupinsky District